Daniel Claudon (born 30 August 1943) is a French biathlete. He competed at the 1968 Winter Olympics and the 1972 Winter Olympics.

References

1943 births
Living people
French male biathletes
Olympic biathletes of France
Biathletes at the 1968 Winter Olympics
Biathletes at the 1972 Winter Olympics
Sportspeople from Vosges (department)